The 2020 Galway Senior Football Championship is the 125th edition of Galway GAA's premier Gaelic football tournament for senior graded clubs in County Galway, Ireland. The winners receive the Frank Fox Cup but will not represent Galway in the Connacht Senior Club Football Championship, which was cancelled for 2020 due to the impact of the COVID-19 pandemic on Gaelic games.

Eighteen teams compete in the competition. This year's format was originally planned to mirror last year's format with the draw being carried out in February 2020.  However due to the emergence of the COVID-19 pandemic, the format was altered to reduce the number of matches to be played. A new draw was made on 3 July 2020 to compensate for these changes. 

Corofin were the defending champions for the sixth consecutive year after they defeated Tuam Stars after a replay in the 2019 final. 

This was All Ireland I.C.F.C. champions Oughterard's return the senior grade for the first time in 17 seasons (since their relegation from the S.F.C. in 2002) after they claimed to 2019 I.F.C. title. They were promoted along with the I.F.C. finalists Michael Breathnach's, who return to the Senior grade after their relegation in 2017.

Team Changes
The following teams have changed division since the 2019 championship season.

To S.F.C.
Promoted from 2019 Galway I.F.C.
 Oughterard  -  (Intermediate Champions)
 Micheál Breathnachs  -  (Intermediate Finalists)

From S.F.C.
Relegated to 2020 Galway I.F.C.
 Killererin
 Naomh Anna Leitir Móir

Group stage 
There are four groups called Group 1, 2, 3 and 4. Groups 1, 2 and 3 each contain four teams drawn randomly. The 1st and 2nd placed teams in each of these groups will qualify for the quarter-finals, while the 4th placed team will proceed to the Relegation Semi-Finals. Group 4 is divided into two sub-groups called Group 4A and Group 4B, each containing 3 teams. The 1st and 2nd placed teams in Group 4A will play the 2nd and 1st placed teams in Group 4B, with the two winners qualifying for the quarter-finals. The 3rd placed team in both Group 4A and 4B will play-off, with the loser proceeding to the Relegation Semi-Finals.

Group 1

Round 1
 Barna 2-7, 0-10 Spiddal, 1/8/2020,
 Salthill/Knocknacarra 3-13, 0-10 St. Michael's, 2/8/2020, 

Round 2
 Salthill/Knocknacarra -vs- Barna, 14/8/2020,
 St Michael's -vs- Spiddal, 15/8/2020,

Round 3
 Salthill/Knocknacarra -vs- Spiddal, ?/8/2020,
 St Michael's -vs- Barna, ?/8/2020,

Group 2

Round 1
 Moycullen 2-7, 0-10 Micheál Breathnach's, 1/8/2020,
 Mountbellew/Moylough 1-7, 0-8 Annaghdown, 2/8/2020, 

Round 2
 Annaghdown -vs- Moycullen, 15/8/2020,
 Mountbellew/Moylough -vs- Micheál Breathnach's, 16/8/2020,

Round 3
 Annaghdown -vs- Micheál Breathnach's, ?/8/2020,
 Mountbellew/Moylough -vs- Moycullen, ?/8/2020,

Group 3

Round 1
 Killannin 0-11, 0-10 Claregalway, 31/7/2020,
 Caherlistrane 1-7, 1-9 Tuam Stars, 1/8/2020, 

Round 2
 Tuam Stars -vs- Killannin, 16/8/2020,
 Caherlistrane -vs- Claregalway, 16/8/2020,

Round 3
 Caherlistrane -vs- Killannin, ?/8/2020,
 Tuam Stars -vs- Claregalway, ?/8/2020,

Group 4

Group 4A

Round 1
 Corofin 7-17, 0-11 Oughterard, 2/8/2020, 

Round 2
 Corofin 4-18 0-7 Monivea/Abbey, 9/8/2020,

Round 3
 Oughterard -vs- Monivea/Abbey, ?/8/2020,

Group 4B

Round 1
 Milltown 0-10, 1-6 An Cheathrú Rua, 1/8/2020, 

Round 2
 An Cheathrú Rua 0-15 1-10 St James', 9/8/2020,

Round 3
 Milltown -vs- St James', ?/8/2020,

Group 4 play-offs
Group 4 Quarter-Final play-offs
 1st Group 4A -vs- 2nd Group 4B,
 1st Group 4B -vs- 2nd Group 4A,

Group 4 relegation play-off
 3rt Group 4A -vs- 3rd Group 4B,

Relegation play-offs

Relegation Semi-Finals
The 4th placed teams from Groups 1, 2 and 3 along with the Group 4 relegation play-off Loser face-off in the Relegation Semi-Finals. The two winners from these Semi-Finals will secure their Senor status for 2021, while the two losers will proceed to the Relegation Final.

Relegation Final
The loser of the Relegation final will be relegated to the 2021 Galway I.F.C. The winner will maintain their Senior status into 2021.

Finals

Quarter-finals
The 1st and 2nd placed teams in Groups 1, 2 and 3 along with the two Group 4 Quarter-Final play-off winnersqualify for the quarter-finals.

Semi-finals

Final

References

External links

Galway Senior Football Championship
Galway Senior Football Championship
Galway SFC